Landsdale is a northern suburb of Perth, Western Australia located within the local government area of the City of Wanneroo.  It is mixed use, with residential, commercial and light manufacturing areas.

History
In the late 1990s, Landsdale began to develop from market gardens and small rural lots into residential development. Until 1997–1998, prior to the separation by the City of Wanneroo of the suburbs of Darch and Madeley, Landsdale enclosed a much larger area extending westwards to Wanneroo Road.

Facilities
The main commercial precinct is known as Landsdale Gardens and includes most of the facilities of the area, such as a small medical complex, the Warradale centre (named after Warradale Park), parks and reserves, lakes, walking trails, Landsdale Forum shopping centre. 

The Warradale Centre (named after nearby Warradale Park on Southmead Drive) is used for community events and includes a club room and change rooms as well as a canteen, parking and toilet facilities.  It is used for local sporting clubs including; the Kingsway Rockets Football Club, the Landsdale Lions Junior and Senior Cricket Club as well as a small tee ball club.

Landsdale also has an ambulance station located on the corner of Alexander Drive and Gnangara Road.

The Perth International Telecommunications Centre is located in the eastern end of Landsdale.

Schools
Landsdale has 3 Primary Schools and 1 High School, 1 in the south called Carnaby Rise Primary School and one in the centre called Landsdale Primary School. There is a new Primary School opening in February 2023 called Landsdale Gardens Primary School. The only High School is Landsdale Christian School.

Transport
Landsdale is serviced by three Transperth bus routes, operated by Path Transit and Swan Transit; Route 376 from Mirrabooka bus station and to Whitfords railway station, and the 450 to Warwick railway station, allowing Landsdale residents to connect by train to Perth's central business district; and the 355 goes to Whitfords Station as well via Gnangara Road, with the other way goes to Ellenbrook.

References

Suburbs of Perth, Western Australia
Suburbs of the City of Wanneroo